Ilya Konstantinovich Zhigulyov (born 1 February 1996) is a Russian footballer who plays as a central midfielder for Pari NN.

Club career
He made his professional debut in the Russian Professional Football League for FC Krasnodar-2 on 1 November 2013 in a game against FC Druzhba Maykop.

He made his debut for the main squad of FC Krasnodar on 28 February 2017 in a Russian Cup game against FC Ural Yekaterinburg. He made his Russian Premier League debut for Krasnodar on 5 March 2017 in a game against FC Spartak Moscow.

On 9 February 2018, he joined FC Tosno on loan until the end of the 2017–18 season. He played as FC Tosno won the 2017–18 Russian Cup final against FC Avangard Kursk on 9 May 2018 in the Volgograd Arena.

On 30 August 2018, he signed with FC Ural Yekaterinburg for another season-long loan, reuniting with his former Tosno coach Dmytro Parfenov.

On 4 August 2020, he joined FC Rotor Volgograd on loan for the 2020–21 season.

On 20 August 2021, he signed a two-year contract with the Polish club Zagłębie Lubin. On 20 April 2022, he left the club by mutual consent.

On 1 September 2022, Zhigulyov moved to Russian Premier League club Pari NN on a two-year contract.

Honours

Club
Tosno
 Russian Cup: 2017–18

Career statistics

References

External links
 
 
 

1996 births
Sportspeople from Krasnodar Krai
Living people
Russian footballers
Russia under-21 international footballers
Association football midfielders
FC Krasnodar-2 players
FC Milsami Orhei players
FC Krasnodar players
FC Tosno players
FC Ural Yekaterinburg players
FC Rotor Volgograd players
Zagłębie Lubin players
FC Nizhny Novgorod (2015) players
Russian Second League players
Moldovan Super Liga players
Russian Premier League players
Russian First League players
Ekstraklasa players
Russian expatriate footballers
Expatriate footballers in Moldova
Russian expatriate sportspeople in Moldova
Expatriate footballers in Poland
Russian expatriate sportspeople in Poland